The 2009 Women's Pan American Cup was the 3rd edition of the Women's Pan American Cup, the quadrennial international women's field hockey championship of the Americas organised by the Pan American Hockey Federation. It was held between 7 and 15 February 2009 in Hamilton, Bermuda.

The tournament doubled as the qualifier to the 2010 World Cup to be held in Rosario, Argentina. The winner would qualify directly while teams ranked between second and sixth would have the chance to obtain one of three berths at the World Cup Qualifiers. The top six teams also qualified for the 2013 Women's Pan American Cup.

Argentina won the tournament for the third consecutive time after defeating the United States 7–6 in the final on penalty strokes after a 2–2 draw. The United States made a protest against the result of the sudden death penalty stroke alleging irregularities before the shot performed by Noel Barrionuevo but were overruled by the tournament director. After submitting an appeal to the said decision, it was overruled by the Jury of Appeal. As the protest was made right after the match finished, only the bronze medals were given to the players. The trophy and gold and silver medals were awarded at the airport, just before both teams took their flights returning to their countries.

As future hosts of the 2010 World Cup, Argentina had a berth to participate at it regardless of their ranking in this tournament. By winning it, the European confederation received an extra quota.

Umpires
Below are the 10 umpires appointed by the Pan American Hockey Federation:

Frances Block (ENG)
Arely Castellanos (MEX)
Jean Duncan (SCO)
Amy Hassick (USA)
Kang Hyun-young (KOR)
Ayanna McClean (TRI)
Irene Presenqui (ARG)
Emma Simmons (BER)
Wendy Stewart (CAN)
Claudia Videla (CHI)

Results
All times are Atlantic Standard Time (UTC−04:00)

First round

Pool A

 Advanced to semifinals

Pool B

 Advanced to semifinals

Fifth to eighth place classification

Cross-overs

Seventh and eighth place

Fifth and sixth place

First to fourth place classification

Semi-finals

Third and fourth place

Final

Statistics

Final standings

Awards

Goalscorers

See also
2009 Men's Pan American Cup

References

External links
Official website

Women's Pan American Cup
Pan American Cup
Pan American Cup
Qualification tournaments for the 2011 Pan American Games
Pan American Cup
International women's field hockey competitions hosted by Bermuda
Pan American Cup